Cyligramma simplex is a moth of the family Noctuidae. This moth species is commonly found in Nigeria.

References

Endemic fauna of Nigeria
Catocalinae
Insects of West Africa
Insects of Uganda
Owlet moths of Africa